Ger Cornally (1913 - 18 April 1992) was an Irish hurler who played as a full-back for the Tipperary senior team.

Born in Thurles, County Tipperary, Cornally first arrived on the inter-county scene when he first linked up with the Tipperary junior team. He made his senior debut during the 1937 championship. Cornally immediately became a regular member of the starting fifteen and won two All-Ireland medals and three Munster medals.

As a member of the Munster inter-provincial team on a number of occasions, Cornally won two Railway Cup medals. At club level he was an eight-time championship medallist with Thurles Sarsfields.

Cornally retired from inter-county hurling following the conclusion of the 1948 championship.

Honours

Player

Thurles Sarsfields
Tipperary Senior Hurling Championship (8): 1935, 1936, 1938, 1939, 1942, 1944, 1945, 1946 (c)

Tipperary
All-Ireland Senior Hurling Championship (2): 1937, 1945
Munster Senior Hurling Championship (3): 1937, 1941, 1945

Munster
Railway Cup (3): 1938 (sub), 1940, 1946 (c)

References

1913 births
1992 deaths
All-Ireland Senior Hurling Championship winners
Munster inter-provincial hurlers
Thurles Sarsfields hurlers
Tipperary inter-county hurlers